Luis Antonio Ramos (born July 13, 1973) is an American actor who has been on and starred in various film and television shows such as Martin, Early Edition, New York Undercover, In The House, Friends, The Shield, CSI, and CSI: Miami.

Early life 
Born in San Germán, Puerto Rico, Ramos was raised in the Bronx, New York. He graduated from the High School of Performing Arts.

Career 
Ramos list of feature film credits includes Checking Out, Latin Dragon, L.A. Riots Spectacular, Sawbones, Scorpion Spring, Hostile Intentions, Out-of-Sync, Do the Right Thing, Sea of Love, The Sacrifice Fly, Moscow on the Hudson, The Ultimate Solution of Grace Quigley, The Secret of My Success, and The Return of Superfly, among others.

On TV, he was previously a series regular on both The Brian Benben Show and Queens, and also had recurring roles on In the House, Ink, and Martin. He has also had guest-starring roles on NYPD Blue, Just Shoot Me, The Drew Carey Show, The Jamie Foxx Show, New York Undercover, Mad About You, Law & Order and Miami Vice. In addition, Ramos has starred in a number of television movies, including The Other Side of Dark, Mothershed or Berndt, The Anissa Ayala Story, and Nails.

Miracle In Spanish Harlem, in which Ramos plays a single father of two young girls, was released in 2013. He played Carlos Rojas in Frank Reyes’s The Ministers, and Ricky Guzman on USA Network's The Huntress. He has appeared on the television series How To Grow Up In America, The Unit, Burn Notice, Wanted, Numb3rs, The Shield, Early Edition, CSI Miami, The Closer, Alias, Nip/Tuck, CSI: Crime Scene Investigation, Friends, Strong Medicine, Blue Bloods, The Division, Arli$$ and Roc.

Ramos has also been the Goodwill Ambassador for the Puerto Rican Day Parade in New York City, the Godfather for the Puerto Rican Day Parade in Los Angeles and the Godfather for the Puerto Rican parade in Cleveland, Ohio.

Ramos was nominated for an Alma Award for best supporting actor for his work in The Huntress. He also received the Helen Hayes Award for Best Actor for his performance in the play Stand Up Tragedy. His additional theater work includes Dancing on Her Knees, Cloud Tectonics, Romeo and Juliet, Tears Will Tell It All, Widows, Richard II, Henry the IV, Pendragon, The Sound of Music, A Midsummer Night’s Dream, and Latins from Manhattan among others.

Personal life 
Ramos resides in Los Angeles. In his free time races bicycles, plays baseball, and writes a blog. In 2022, Ramos was inducted into the Bronx Walk of Fame.

Filmography

Film

Television

See also

List of Puerto Ricans

References

External links

 Luis Antonio Ramos on Getty Images
 Actor on a Bike blog by Luis Antonio Ramos
 

1973 births
Living people
American male television actors
American male film actors
People from San Germán, Puerto Rico
Puerto Rican male actors